Legends is a food, beverage, merchandise, retail, and stadium operations corporation serving entertainment venues and companies. Formed in 2008, Legends is a joint venture of Yankee Global Enterprises and Jerry Jones of the Dallas Cowboys.

On October 20, 2008, Cowboys owner Jones and New York Yankees owner George Steinbrenner announced a joint business venture called Legends Hospitality Management LLC which would operate the concessions and merchandising sales at the AT&T Stadium in Arlington, Texas, and at the new Yankee Stadium in the Bronx, New York, along with the stadiums of the Yankees' minor league affiliates.  The company was also backed by Wall Street investment firm Goldman Sachs and Dallas private equity firm CIC Partners LP.

Legends has since branched out to multiple venues across the world such as the One World Observatory in a 15-year, $875 million contract, Levi's Stadium, Indianapolis Motor Speedway and IndyCar, Banc of California Stadium, Nissan Stadium, Angel Stadium, Golden 1 Center, SoFi Stadium, Allegiant Stadium, University of Southern California, Prudential Center, Notre Dame, the Rose Bowl, Oklahoma Sooners, Dallas Mavericks and numerous other professional and college venues and companies. The company is estimated to be worth around $750 million.

It has in addition branched out in what it offers. Although Legends began as a concessions company it has since expanded to help teams build and operate stadiums. It also sells naming rights, tickets, and Personal seat licenses on behalf of teams. In 2019, Legends negotiated the largest naming rights deal in the National Football League when SoFi agreed to a 20-year, $30 million per year deal with Kroenke Sports & Entertainment and the Los Angeles Chargers to sponsor SoFi Stadium in Inglewood, California.

In 2021, Legends was bought by Sixth Street Partners, who now lead the Legends partnership group with co-founders YGE Holdings, LLC, an affiliate of the New York Yankees, and Jones Concessions LP, an affiliate of the Dallas Cowboys.

References

External links
Official website

Catering and food service companies of the United States
Hospitality companies of the United States
American companies established in 2008
Joint ventures
Yankee Global Enterprises
Dallas Cowboys
Ticket sales companies
2008 establishments in New York City
Hospitality companies established in 2008
Food and drink companies established in 2008
Food and drink companies based in New York City
2021 mergers and acquisitions